Nilah Magruder is an American comic artist who also works in storyboarding and animation.

Life and career
Born in Pasadena, Maryland, Magruder gained a Bachelor of Arts in communication during 2005 from Hood College as well as a Bachelor of Fine Arts in computer animation from Ringling College of Art and Design.

She was the first winner of the Dwayne McDuffie Award for Diversity in Comics in 2015 for her web comic M.F.K. In 2016 she became the first Black woman to write for Marvel Comics. Her work first appeared in A Year of Marvels: September Infinite Comic #1 with a crossover comic featuring characters Tippy-Toe, Squirrel Girl's animal sidekick, and Rocket Raccoon from Guardians of the Galaxy. In 2016 Insight Comics licensed M.F.K. for print distribution with its first volume released in September 2017.  She also worked on the series Marvel Rising and Vault of Spiders.

In addition to creating comics, Magruder has also forged a career as a storyboard artist, animator for film and television, and an illustrator for children's books. She has worked with Disney, DreamWorks, and Cannon Busters.

Bibliography 

 How To Find A Fox
 M.F.K.: Book One
 All Out: The No-Longer-Secret Stories of Queer Teens Throughout the Ages
 Dactyl Hill Squad
 A Year Of Marvels: September Infinite Comic #1

References 

African-American women writers
Hood College alumni
Living people
Ringling College of Art and Design alumni
African-American illustrators
Marvel Comics people
Year of birth missing (living people)